Noble Consort Wen (1835 – 20 December 1890), of the Manchu Plain Yellow Banner Xu clan, was a consort of Xianfeng Emperor.

Life

Family background 
Noble Consort Wen was a Manchurian Booi Aha of the Plain Yellow Banner Xu clan, a branch of a prominent Šumuru clan.

Father: Chengyi, served as an official.

Daoguang era 
Noble Consort Wen was born in 1835.

Xianfeng era 
Lady Xu entered the Forbidden city in 1853 and was granted a title "First Class Female Attendant Wen". Lady Xu was described as a beautiful and elegant woman. Thus, she was favoured by Xianfeng Emperor. In May 1854, she was promoted to "Noble Lady Wen". Her residence in Forbidden City was Palace of Eternal Harmony. 

In 1855, Noble Lady Wen was demoted for the first time to a "First Class Female Attendant Wen" from reasons unknown. In July 1855, she vented her anger on the palace maid. While the severe punishment was being performed, Lady Xu was joking with an eunuch. That incident infuriated Xianfeng Emperor so much that she was demoted to a chosen maid. The head eunuch of her residence, Sun Laifu, was sent into slavery. 

The demotion meant exclusion from the imperial harem because rank "chosen maid" was not included in the official list.  Her clan was downgraded to Booi Aha (bondservants) in one month. Xianfeng Emperor restored lady Xu as "First Class Female Attendant Wen" on 25 July 1856, and to "Noble Lady Wen" shortly after the previous promotion. Noble Lady Wen was promoted to "Concubine Wen" in April 1858. On 8 January 1859, she gave birth to the second imperial prince.

Tongzhi era 
In 1861, after the ascension to the throne of Tongzhi Emperor, Concubine Wen was promoted to "Consort Wen". In 1873, her son was posthumously honored as "Prince Min of the Second Rank" ("min" meaning "sympathy"). On 8 December 1874, Consort Wen was elevated to "Noble Consort Wen".

Guangxu era 
Noble Consort Wen died on 20 December 1890. Her coffin was temporarily placed at Tiancun Immortal Palace and later interred in the Ding Mausoleum in the Eastern Qing tombs alongside Imperial Noble Consort Zhuangjing.

Titles 
 During the reign of the Daoguang Emperor (r. 1820–1850):
 Lady Xu (from 1835)
 During the reign of the Xianfeng Emperor (r. 1850–1861):
 First Class Female Attendant Wen (from 1853), seventh rank consort 
 Noble Lady Wen (from May 1854), sixth rank consort 
 First Class Female Attendant Wen (from 1855), seventh rank consort 
 Chosen Maid (from unknown date)
 First Class Female Attendant Wen (from 25 July 1856), seventh rank consort 
 Noble Lady Wen (from unknown date), sixth rank consort 
 Concubine Wen (from April 1858), fifth rank consort 
 During the reign of the Tongzhi Emperor (r. 1861–1875):
 Consort Wen (from 1861), fourth rank consort 
 Noble Consort Wen (from 8 December 1874), third rank consort

Issue 
 As Concubine Wen:
 Prince Min of the Second Rank (8 January 1859), second son

See also
 Ranks of imperial consorts in China#Qing
 Royal and noble ranks of the Qing dynasty

References 

Consorts of the Xianfeng Emperor
1835 births
1890 deaths